UFC: Throwdown (full title: Ultimate Fighting Championship: Throwdown), known in Japan as  on the PlayStation 2 and  on the GameCube, is a video game of the fighting game genre released in 2002 by Opus. The game is based on the Ultimate Fighting Championship.

Overview
There are five different game modes; "Career", "UFC Mode", "Arcade", "Tournament" and "Exhibition". Career mode involves creating a fighter, giving him a fighting style, completing a number of "skill challenges" to build up his attributes, then winning five sparring matches before you can enter an eight-man tournament. After the tournament is over, the player picks a new fighting style to learn, and completes the same process until it has been done five times.

In UFC Mode, the player picks a heavyweight or light-heavyweight fighter and must win four fights before having a title match. On winning, the player receives a silver belt, which can later become a gold belt if UFC Mode is completed again with the same fighter. There is also an open-weight division, where the player can face fighters from outside their weight class.

In arcade mode the player selects a fighter and must win ten consecutive fights. Up to eight people can compete in the Tournament mode. Exhibition mode consists of single 1 vs. 1 fights.

The game cover features UFC fighter, Tito Ortiz and the late Charles Lewis Jr., better known as Mask, the founder of the TapouT brand. The full roster includes 28 fighters.

Reception

The game received "average" reviews on both platforms according to the review aggregation website Metacritic.

See also

List of fighting games

References

External links
 

2002 video games
GameCube games
PlayStation 2 games
Capcom games
Genki (company) games
Ubisoft games
Ultimate Fighting Championship video games
Crave Entertainment games
Multiplayer and single-player video games
Video games developed in Japan